The Lacemaker may refer to:
The Lacemaker, a 1977 French drama film.
The Lacemaker (Maes), a circa 1650 painting by Nicolaes Maes.
The Lacemaker (Vermeer), a circa 1670 painting by Johannes Vermeer.
The Lacemaker (after Vermeer), a 1955 copy of Vermeer's work made by Salvador Dalí.